Sital may refer to:
 Sital (25°27′ N 61°15′ E), Chabahar
 Sital (25°29′ N 61°10′ E), Chabahar